The 2003 CA-TennisTrophy was a men's tennis tournament played on indoor hard courts at the Wiener Stadthalle in Vienna in Austria and was part of the International Series Gold of the 2003 ATP Tour. It was the 29th edition of the tournament and took place from 6 October until 12 October 2003. First-seeded Roger Federer won the singles title.

Finals

Singles

 Roger Federer defeated  Carlos Moyá 6–3, 6–3, 6–3
 It was Federer's 7th title of the year and the 15th of his career.

Doubles

 Yves Allegro /  Roger Federer defeated  Mahesh Bhupathi /  Max Mirnyi 7–6(9–7), 7–5
 It was Allegro's only title of the year and the 1st of his career. It was Federer's 8th title of the year and the 16th of his career.

References

External links
 Official website
 ATP tournament profile
 ITF tournament edition details

CA-TennisTrophy
Vienna Open